Steve Hadley may refer to:

 Stephen Hadley (born 1947), U.S. government official
 Steve Hadley (musician), Australian musician